Mary Catherine McCormack (born February 8, 1969) is an American actress. She has had leading roles as Justine Appleton on the series Murder One (1995–97), as Deputy National Security Adviser Kate Harper on The West Wing (2004–06), as Deputy U.S. Marshal Mary Shannon on In Plain Sight (2008–12), and as Peggy on the comedy series The Kids Are Alright (2018–19).

McCormack's film roles include Private Parts (1997), Deep Impact (1998), True Crime (1999), Mystery, Alaska (1999), K-PAX (2001), Dickie Roberts: Former Child Star (2003) and 1408 (2007).

Early life 
McCormack was born in Plainfield, New Jersey. She is the daughter of clinical therapist Norah and car dealership and ice cream parlor owner William McCormack. Her parents divorced in 1990. Her sister Bridget was the chief justice of the Michigan Supreme Court and a professor of law at the University of Michigan Law School. Her brother William is an actor, writer and producer who has appeared in a recurring role as FBI agent Robert O'Connor on In Plain Sight.

In 1987, McCormack graduated from the Wardlaw-Hartridge School in Edison, New Jersey. In 1991, she received her BA in comparative arts, specifically painting and creative writing, from Trinity College in Hartford, Connecticut.

Career 
McCormack began her acting career at age 12, performing in Gian Carlo Menotti's Christmas opera Amahl and the Night Visitors. She continued her stage work in musicals and finished an acting program at the William Esper Studio. She has worked in New York theater productions, including The Atlantic Theater Company, Alice's 4th Floor, and Naked Angels, where she appeared in Jon Robin Baitz's A Fair Country.

McCormack portrayed Justine Appleton on Murder One (1995–1997) and also starred in the HBO series K Street. She starred in Howard Stern's movie Private Parts in 1997. In 2004, McCormack joined the cast of The West Wing as Deputy National Security Advisor and ex-CIA officer Kate Harper. Her character soon became a recurring role throughout the last three seasons.

McCormack starred in the USA Network series In Plain Sight. She portrayed Mary Shannon, a deputy United States marshal attached to the Albuquerque, New Mexico, office of the Federal Witness Security Program (WITSEC), more commonly known as the Federal Witness Protection Program. On July 28, 2010, the show was renewed for its fourth and fifth seasons, to run in 2011 and 2012. The show was ended in 2011, making the fifth season its last. After its end, McCormack was cast as the lead in Kari Lizer's untitled comedy pilot on ABC.

McCormack was nominated for the 2008 Tony Award for Best Performance by a Featured Actress in a Play for the role of Gretchen in the 2008 Broadway revival of Boeing Boeing.

McCormack appeared seven times as a guest on The Late Late Show with Craig Ferguson. On her fourth visit in 2009, she gave the host, Craig Ferguson, a novelty coffee mug in the shape of a rattlesnake from the gift shop of the American International Rattlesnake Museum in Albuquerque. Ferguson promised to use this mug on all future shows and kept his promise. After his last show, he donated the mug back to the museum.

In 2012, McCormack reunited with the cast of The West Wing to film a video that served both as a reminder that U.S. voters should vote for nonpartisan candidates when they cast their ballots and as a video promoting McCormack's sister's ultimately successful judicial candidacy for the Michigan State Supreme Court.

In October 2013, McCormack started filming scenes for The Crash (previously titled A Conspiracy on Jekyll Island) alongside Frank Grillo, AnnaSophia Robb, Minnie Driver, Dianna Agron, John Leguizamo, Ed Westwick, Christopher McDonald and Maggie Q. The film is directed by Aram Rappaport and produced by Hilary Shor, Atit Shah and Aaron Becker. The film had a direct-to-VOD and limited release on January 13, 2017, in North America.

In 2016, McCormack played a supporting role in the Amazon.com exclusive special An American Girl Story – Maryellen 1955: Extraordinary Christmas alongside Alyvia Alyn Lind, who played the title character.

In 2018, McCormack began starring in the ABC sitcom The Kids Are Alright as Catholic family matriarch Peggy Cleary. ABC canceled the series after one season.

Personal life
In July 2003, McCormack married director and producer Michael Morris. Together they have three children.

McCormack and Morris are executive producers of the game show 25 Words or Less, hosted by Meredith Vieira. McCormack is a frequent celebrity panelist on the show, as are fellow executive producers Lisa Kudrow and Dan Bucatinsky.

McCormack is the godmother of In Plain Sight co-star Fred Weller's daughter.

Filmography

Film

Television

Theatre

References

External links 
 
 

1969 births
Living people
Actresses from New Jersey
American film actresses
American stage actresses
American television actresses
People from Plainfield, New Jersey
Trinity College (Connecticut) alumni
Wardlaw-Hartridge School alumni
20th-century American actresses
21st-century American actresses